Sergei Sergeyevich Korsakov (22 January 1854, Gus-Khrustalny – 1 May 1900, Moscow) was a Russian neuropsychiatrist, known for his studies on alcoholic psychosis. His name is lent to the eponymous Korsakov's syndrome and Wernicke–Korsakoff syndrome.

Early life and education
Sergei Korsakov was the first great Russian neuropsychiatrist. He studied medicine at the Moscow State University, graduated in 1875 and subsequently became a physician at the "Preobrazhenski" mental hospital.

From 1876 to 1879, he gained postgraduate experience in the clinic for nervous diseases under Aleksei Kozhevnikov. His thesis Alcoholic Paralysis gained him a medical doctorate in 1887.

Career
In 1892, Korsakov was appointed professor extraordinarius at a new university psychiatric clinic. During this time, he visited Vienna, where he was a pupil of Theodor Meynert. He was ordinarius of neurology and psychiatry from 1899 until his death the next year. He died from heart failure at the age of 46.

Legacy
Korsakov was one of the greatest neuropsychiatrists of the 19th century and published numerous works in neuropathology, psychiatry, and forensic medicine. Apart from his studies on alcoholic psychosis, he introduced the concept of paranoia and wrote an excellent textbook on psychiatry published in 1893. Additionally, he was a proponent of the non-restraint treatment in psychiatry. Korsakov studied the effects of alcoholism on the nervous system and drew attention to several cases of alcoholic polyneuropathy with distinctive mental symptoms (Korsakov's syndrome).

An able organiser, Korsakov was instrumental in founding the Moscow Society of Neuropathologists and Psychiatrists. The Zhurnal nevropatologii i psikhiatrii imeni Korsakova (Korsakov's Journal of Neuropathology and Psychiatry) was named after him.

According to a study conducted in 2015, Korsakov was included in "Russia team on medicine". This list includes fifty-three famous Russian medical scientists from the Russian Federation, the Soviet Union, and the Russian Empire who were born in 1757—1950. Physicians of all specialities listed here. Among them Vladimir Bekhterev, Vladimir Demikhov, Ivan Pavlov, Nikolay Pirogov, Victor Skumin.

Associated eponyms
 Korsakov's syndrome: Amnestic-confabulatory syndrome with three salient features (1) severe memory defect, especially for recent events; (2) confabulation (i.e., falsification of memory in an alert, responsive individual); and (3) polyneuropathy (psychosis polyneuritica), usually associated with alcoholism and malnutrition.
 Wernicke-Korsakov syndrome or Polioencephalitis haemorrhagica superior associated with Korsakov's psychosis: A condition characterized by nystagmus, ocular and Conjugate gaze palsy, ataxia and psychosis due to nutritional deficiency, more specifically of thiamine and observed mainly, though not exclusively, in alcoholics.

Publications
1890 Eine psychische Störung combiniert mit multipler Neuritis (Psychosis polyneuritica seu Cerebropathia psychica toxaemica)
1890 Ueber eine besondere Form psychischer Störung, combiniert mit multipler Neuritis

References

Further reading

1854 births
1900 deaths
People from Gus-Khrustalny
Russian psychiatrists
Scientists from the Russian Empire